Little Love Affairs was Nanci Griffith's sixth studio album, and it had similar success to the preceding album, Lone Star State of Mind, on the Billboard charts. The album peaked at #27 on the Country Albums chart and one of its tracks entered into the Top 40 of the Hot Country Singles chart: "I Knew Love" rose to #37. Two more tracks also charted: "Never Mind" at #58, and "Anyone Can Be Somebody's Fool" at #64.

LP track listing

Side one 
"Anyone Can Be Somebody's Fool" (Nanci Griffith) – 2:39
"I Knew Love" (Roger Brown) – 3:17
"Never Mind" (Harlan Howard) – 3:42
"Love Wore a Halo (Back Before the War)" (Griffith) – 3:23
"So Long Ago" (Griffith) – 4:10
"Gulf Coast Highway" duet with Mac McAnally (James Hooker, Griffith, Danny Flowers) – 3:06

Side two 
"Little Love Affairs" (Griffith, Hooker) – 3:08
"I Wish It Would Rain" (Griffith) – 2:38
"Outbound Plane" (Griffith, Tom Russell) – 2:39
"I Would Change My Life" (Robert Earl Keen, Jr) – 3:08
"Sweet Dreams Will Come" duet with John Stewart (John Stewart) – 4:25

Personnel 
 Nanci Griffith - acoustic guitar, lead vocals, backing vocals
 Charlie Bundy- backing vocals
 Sam Bush - mandolin
 John Catchings - cello
 Béla Fleck - banjo
 Dan Flowers - slide guitar, backing vocals
 Pat Flynn - acoustic guitar
 Jon Goin - classical guitar, electric guitar. hi-string guitar
 Lloyd Green - dobro, piano
 James Hooker - piano, synthesizer
 David Hungate - bass guitar
 Roy Huskey Jr. - upright bass
 Lucy Kaplansky - backing vocals
 Mac McAnally - gut-string guitar and duet vocals on "Gulf Coast Highway"
 Rick Marotta - drums
 Mark O'Connor - mandolin, viola, violin
 John Stewart - electric guitar and duet vocals on "Sweet Dreams Will Come"
 Billy Joe Walker Jr. - acoustic guitar

Chart performance

References 

Nanci Griffith albums
1988 albums
Albums produced by Tony Brown (record producer)
MCA Records albums